The pug is a breed of dog.

Pug or Pugs may also refer to:

Acronym
 PHP User Group
 Pick-up game
 Pontificia Universita Gregoriana

People
 Pug (nickname)

Fictional characters
 Pug, a main character in the play The Devil Is an Ass by Ben Jonson, first performed in 1616
 Pug (fictional character), a magician featured in Raymond E. Feist's series of'fantasy novels
 Captain Victor "Pug" Henry, USN, central character in Herman Wouk's novels The Winds of War and War and Remembrance
 Pat "Pug" Brady, a sidekick of comic book crime fighter the Clock (comics)

Other uses
 Several species of Eupitheciini moths
 Order of the Pug, a para-Masonic society
 Pug Hill, Central Park, New York City
 "Pug", a song on the 1998 album Adore by The Smashing Pumpkins
 Pugs (programming), an interpreter and compiler for the Perl 6 programming language
 Pug, an HTML template engine; see Comparison of web template engines
 Pug (steam locomotive), British nickname for a small, 0-4-0ST (saddle tank) shunting locomotive
 A prepared earth or clay mixture sometimes made in a pugmill
 Pug Impression Pad, a device used to track wild animals
 Pug Awards, a Toronto, Canada architecture award that rates buildings based on popular votes
 pug, the ISO 639-3 code for the Puguli language of Burkina Faso, Africa
 PUG, IATA Airport Code for Port Augusta Airport in South Australia